Misty Dawn Marie Hyman (born March 23, 1979) is an American former competition swimmer, Olympic gold medalist, and former world record-holder.  Hyman won the gold medal in the women's 200-meter butterfly at the 2000 Summer Olympics in Sydney.

In March 1996, she just missed making the U.S. Olympic team for the 1996 Games, finishing third and fourth at the U.S. Olympic Trials in the 100- and 200-meter butterfly events.

Hyman competed as a member of the U.S. Finswimming Team at the 8th World Championship held in Hungary during August 1996.

At the 2000 Summer Olympics in Sydney, Australia, Hyman was only expected to contend for silver in women's 200-meter butterfly on the night of September 20, 2000, as Australian Susie O'Neill was expected to repeat her title (O'Neill had been undefeated in the 200-meter butterfly for the previous 6 years; and was swimming in her home country). Hyman was so shocked that she looked at the scoreboard three times just to make sure that she had won. Hyman's victory was largely credited to her expert use of the very difficult fish kick on turns.

Also in 2000, Hyman was ranked 35th in the world in the 50-meter butterfly, twelfth in the 100-meter butterfly, and second in the 200-meter butterfly.

Personal

Hyman graduated from Shadow Mountain High School in Phoenix, Arizona.  She attended Stanford University, where she swam for the Stanford Cardinal swimming and diving team with Jessica Foschi.  During this time, she befriended Chelsea Clinton, who was watching in the stands in Sydney when Hyman won gold.  She twice received the Honda Sports Award for Swimming and Diving, recognizing her as the outstanding college female swimmer of the year in 1997–98 and again in 2000–01. She graduated from Stanford in 2002 and earned an MBA in Hospitality at Les Roches University in Switzerland.

In 2009, Hyman returned to Shadow Mountain High School and was appointed the Head Swim Coach. She would later be awarded the "Coach of the Year" award later that season. Hyman switched to part-time coaching at SMHS in 2011.

Hyman swam at AFOX under head coach and swim improver Bob Gillett. He was not there to see her swim, but her performance in the "golden" swim is among his biggest accomplishments.

In 1984, Hyman was diagnosed with asthma.

On November 19, 2009, it was announced that Hyman would be teaching private swim instructions as a part of the fitness team at the Sanctuary on Camelback Resort. Now, she has built her own pool and teaches there as well as the Sanctuary  in her home state of Arizona in Paradise Valley, working with people at all levels of performance ability.

In 2015, Hyman was named an assistant coach at Arizona State University's swimming and diving team.

See also

 List of Olympic medalists in swimming (women)
 List of Stanford University people
 List of World Aquatics Championships medalists in swimming (women)
 World record progression 50 metres butterfly
 World record progression 100 metres butterfly

References

External links
 
 

1979 births
Living people
American female backstroke swimmers
American female butterfly swimmers
World record setters in swimming
Medalists at the FINA World Swimming Championships (25 m)
Olympic gold medalists for the United States in swimming
Sportspeople from Mesa, Arizona
Sportspeople from Phoenix, Arizona
Stanford Cardinal women's swimmers
Swimmers at the 2000 Summer Olympics
World Aquatics Championships medalists in swimming
Finswimmers
Medalists at the 2000 Summer Olympics
21st-century American women